The 2011 Asia Series was the fifth time the Asia Series has been held, and the first after a two-year break. The tournament was held in Taiwan, the first time it has been held outside Japan. Though originally scheduled to commence on 11 November, the tournament was postponed by two weeks to allow for the delayed finish to the Nippon Professional Baseball (NPB) season due to the Tōhoku earthquake and tsunami. The new schedule has the opening games to be played on 25 November, and the championship game concluded the tournament on 29 November.

As had been the case in previous tournaments, the winners of NPB's 2011 Japan Series, Korea Baseball Organization's (KBO) 2011 Korean Series and Chinese Professional Baseball League's (CPBL) 2011 Taiwan Series competed. Though originally included, no team represented the China Baseball League (CBL) due to ″concerns about the team's makeup″. An Australian team participated in the tournament for the first time: the Perth Heat were invited as winners of the Australian Baseball League's (ABL) 2011 Championship series.

The Samsung Lions defeated the Fukuoka SoftBank Hawks in the title game to become the first non-Japanese champion. Starting pitcher Jang Won-Sam was named the MVP of the series.

Participating teams

Format 
Each of the four teams participated in a round-robin series, playing each other team once. The two teams with the best win-loss percentage faced each other in the final, with the team finishing higher considered the "home team", meaning that they had the advantage of batting last. In previous tournaments, if teams were tied a series of tiebreakers were used to decide which teams qualified for the final and in what order, firstly using the head-to-head win–loss records amongst tied teams, and if necessary the ranking based on the lowest team run average.

Round-robin stage

Final

See also 
 2010–11 Australian Baseball League season
 2011 Chinese Professional Baseball League season
 2011 Korea Baseball Organization season
 2011 Nippon Professional Baseball season

References

External links 
 Official Website 

Asia Series
2011 in baseball
Asia Series
International baseball competitions hosted by Taiwan
Asia Series
Sport in Taichung